Cristovam Ricardo Cavalcanti Buarque (born February 20, 1944) is a Brazilian university professor and member of Cidadania. He was a senator for the Federal District from 2003 to 2019.

Biography
Buarque graduated in mechanical engineering from the Federal University of Pernambuco in 1966. At that time he engaged in student politics becoming a militant of the Ação Popular, a group of the Leftist Progressive Church. After the 1964 coup, he was persecuted and exiled to France, where he earned a PhD in economics from the Pantheon-Sorbonne University, Paris, in 1973. He worked at Inter-American Development Bank (IDB) in Ecuador, Honduras, and the United States from 1973–79. He was the first elected rector, by direct vote, of the University of Brasilia in the wake of the military regime; governor of the Federal District; Minister of Education; and current senator, who was elected by a landslide vote. He worked as a consultant for several national and international bodies under the United Nations (UN) and presided over the University for Peace Council and participated in the Food Presidential Commission, which was formerly directed by late sociologist Herbert "Betinho" de Souza.

Buarque is a member of UNESCO's Institute of Education and of the Council of the United Nations University. He initiated the NGO Mission Child, which sponsors an income transfer program for thousands of families and is funded by private enterprises. He was awarded the Jabuti prize of Literature in 1995. He is a staunch defender of the "revolution… through education", a line of thought touted by Brazilian intellectuals like Anísio Teixeira, Darcy Ribeiro, and Paulo Freire.

Buarque proposes an alternative class analysis of modern capitalist societies. According to him, in modern capitalism, the increasing substitution of human labor by automated machines tends to make employed workers a privileged caste, while a new layer of "excluded" people—those who have no jobs, insurance, or health care—is formed. Buarque proposes intervention through government or institutional action on their behalf.

Federal District Governor (1995–98)
His term as Governor of the Federal District was marked by strong tensions in the Workers' Party (PT), particularly in its unionist base.  He managed to persuade the party to support his policies in return for demobilizing most of the PT activists.

The project Bolsa Escola, implemented in the Federal District during his term, now operates   in Brazil and other countries. Despite gaining a 58% approval rating by the Datafolha institute, Buarque was narrowly defeated by Joaquim Roriz (PMDB) in the 1998 election. Buarque attributed his defeat to his opponent's promise to grant a large wage increase to the district's public servants—a promise which was not fulfilled.

Entering PDT
In 2005, after the allegations of corruption involving the Worker's Party (PT), he left the party.

After considering staying in the Senate as an independent, he decided to enter the Democratic Labour Party (PDT) in 1989, with which he had longstanding connections. His proposal to transform education into a national priority is a continuation of the ideas of Darcy Ribeiro.

See also

List of Governors of the Federal District

References

External links
 .
 
 

1944 births
Living people
Candidates for President of Brazil
Governors of the Federal District (Brazil)
Members of the Federal Senate (Brazil)
Brazilian male writers
Brazilian economists
Brazilian mechanical engineers
Brazilian educators
People associated with Federal University of Rio de Janeiro
Sustainability advocates
Education Ministers of Brazil
Cidadania politicians
Democratic Labour Party (Brazil) politicians
Workers' Party (Brazil) politicians
Cavalcanti family
Club of Rome members
Recipients of the Great Cross of the National Order of Scientific Merit (Brazil)
Federal University of Pernambuco alumni